Huang Rong-can (October 17, 1920 – November 11/19?, 1952) was an artist who created the print The Horrifying Inspection (恐怖的檢查) in the aftermath of the 228 Incident in Taiwan. He was born in Chongqing, Sichuan, and was a printmaker in Taiwan. He is recognised as Taiwan's first Chinese left-wing woodcut printmaker.

Early life
Huang Rong-can was born in Chongqing in Sichuan Province, China. He studied in the South West Vocational School of Art (西南藝術職業學校) during the Sino-Japanese war. In 1938, he studied at the Kunming National College of Arts, where he was inspired by the Lu Xun woodcut movement and ideas about the Chinese Revolution.

Work in Mainland China

Huang taught art at a junior high school in Guangxi, and at the same time organised a group to study the woodcut technique. He became a prominent figure in the Chinese Left-Wing Woodcut Movement that was supported by Lu Xun. Huang was the editor and co-editor of woodcut literature publications. In 1943 he organised an exhibition in Liuzhou, Guangxi, of drawings from battle frontlines.

He was deeply motivated by Lu Xun. Lu Xun, in the spirit of social realism, was renowned for adapting Russian and German printmaking to suit the circumstances in China. Lu Xun thought the woodcut was only useful as a tool for propaganda and mass education purposes in the war effort against Japan.  Lu Xun regarded woodcuts as “people’s art”, with its strong black and white lines that could express raw emotion, in order to promote social change. This idea to represent suffering was revolutionary for Chinese art, whose depictions previous to this conformed to the Confucian and Daoist ideals of harmony.

During the Chinese Left-wing Woodcut Movement, he created a lot of realistic woodcuts about life of people and the scenery of the southwest province of China. In 1945 he moved to Shanghai to work at a newspaper, and his works received widespread recognition. Also in 1945, he was recruited for a position to teach in Taiwan, through the Ministry of Education examination process conducted by the Nationalist government from the 1920s to 1949 under Chiang Kai-Shek. He went to Taiwan at the end of 1945 at the age of 25, but he would only be there for seven years of his life before he was executed.

Role in Taiwan's modern art movement

In Taiwan, Huang Rong-can was prolific in print exhibitions. Huang's spiritual guide undoubtedly was Lu Xun. Following Lu Xun in taking inspiration from early twentieth century German expressionist prints, including those by Käthe Kollwitz, Huang captured the local life of the Taiwanese people in his work.

Huang Rong-can was the owner of a bookshop outside of a university in Taipei, and taught younger artists. In 1946, he became an art editor for the newspaper, Ren Min Dao Bao (People's Tribune) and was head of the cultural supplement, Nan Hong. He formed a publishing house, and published books, journals and monthly periodicals. His writing in these various publications led him to become an active figure in introducing Western art history and his research to the Taiwanese art scene. He met some important Taiwanese writers and artists, included Wang Bai Yuan, Lee Shih-chiao, and Yang San-lang. Together, they exchanged and developed their thoughts and ideas.

Huang Rong-can was a professor of the Fine Arts Department at the National Taiwan Normal University, which was at the time called the Teacher's Institute

Fine Arts Study Group

The modern art movement in Taiwan during the White Terror period was intervened at various moments by the state apparatus of the Nationalist KMT government. In the 1950s, mainland artists through state authority positions came to dominate the art scene. Art exhibitions sponsored by government agencies were anti-communist and anti-Russian in nature. The exhibitions were made up of artists from the "New Art movement," which was named after the New Art magazine that promoted the new "Free China" art movement. It was the Chinese Association of Arts and Culture that promoted the "battle arts and culture" policy. In 1951, this association was organised into the Chinese Fine Arts Association by Hu Ko-wei, the deputy director of the General Political Warfare Department under the Department of Defense. Hu Ko-wei enlisted a mainland-born artist named Liu Shih to begin the Fine Arts Study Group under this committee.

Huang Rong-can was hired by Liu Shih to be the academic director of the Fine Arts Study Group. He ran the art class together with Liu Shih in 1950 on Hankou Street in Taipei, called the “Fine Art Study Group”. Here they taught drawing and hired other artists as instructors.  In this group there were such artists as Lee Chun-Shan (Li Chung-sheng), one of the influential pioneers of the modern art movement, as well as  Wu Hao, Chu Te-chun and Hsia Yang. In his role in the Fine Arts Study Group, Huang introduced new colleagues with innovative ideas to the modern art scene in Taiwan, including artists that had studied in Japan. Huang and instructors from the Fine Arts Study group made up a large part of the exhibition artists who participated in Taiwan's first modern painting exhibition, the Modern Painting Group Exhibition at Chungshan Hall in Taipei, held in 1951.
Official dismissal ended the Fine Arts Study Group.

The Horrifying Inspection

In 1947, the 228 Incident occurred. Huang Rong-can did not see the scene that he depicted in The Horrifying Inspection firsthand, but had heard about it from a friend. In search for justice, he began collecting data from witnesses of the 228 Incident. Two months later, he completed the secret The Horrifying Inspection woodcut, based on oral accounts of what happened in the first occurrence that triggered the 228 Incident. The print is a rare visual representation of the 228 Incident from that time. It is a depiction of the widow who was selling cigarettes being seized by authorities, amidst an ensuing scuffle that shows a person getting shot by a bureaucrat.

On April 13, 1947 Huang personally brought The Horrifying Inspection with him on a boat to Shanghai. He published it under a pen name in the newspaper Wen Hui Bao, on April 28, 1947. In Shanghai that November it was displayed in a national woodcut exhibition. From there, Huang donated the print to a Japanese friend, from where it found its way to its present destination in the collection of the Kanagawa Museum of Modern Art in Japan.

The print was also recirculated through its reprint in the magazine Xia Chao. Its image spread widely all across Taiwan, and has become an iconic image of the 228 Incident.

After the 228 event, Huang remained in Taiwan, and taught art in colleges. He also continued to make woodcuts; however, he transferred his subject matter to the aboriginal people in Taitung or Lanyu island. He also travelled to Orchid Island to collect creative material for his work.

Arrest and execution

Huang Rong-can was arrested from the staffroom of the Teacher's College on December 1, 1951. He was put in jail under the accusation of engaging in propaganda, treason and spying for the Chinese Communists. The Nationalist Government accused one of his prints of Orchid Island to be part of Communist Party research to plan the landing of their troops. The Department of Defense Military Bureau sentenced him to death. He was executed in November 1952 at the age of 32.

In Hong Sung-dam's recount of his death, Huang and his girlfriend were arrested as part of the KMT military's suppression of resistance to their regime. They were taken to a prison in Taipei, and days later they were separately shot dead at a cattle market beside a river.

The Ministry of Defence took photos of Huang before his execution, which they sent to the President Chiang Kai-shek after Huang had been shot dead.

According to Mei Dean-E, the official document of his burying permit is recorded as November 19, 1952. However, on his tombstone is written November 14, 1952.

Huang's colleagues in the modernist art movement were extremely psychologically affected by Huang's death. Fellow founder of the studio in Hankow Street Lee Chun Shan began to discourage his students from further organisation of art associations or movements due to such political oppression, and soon after left Taipei. Many senior artists and educators exiled themselves overseas, and the New Art movement ended. Other leftist woodcut painters also migrated. Those who stayed were restricted in their work to anti-communist imagery and apolitical depictions of country life.

Remembrance and legacy

A lot of Huang Rong-can's prints and speeches have been lost.

Huang's grave was only accidentally discovered forty years after his death in a mass grave. A former prisoner of the White Terror period was searching for the body of his brother, a victim of the White Terror, reportedly following directions from a dream. In 1993 they found six mass graves, in which Huang Rong-can was one of the buried.

Huang is buried on a deserted hill in the Taipei Municipal Cemetery, Liuzhangli, with 206 other graves from those people killed in the beginning of the White Terror era. A memorial was established on this site in 2003. In 2014 Taiwanese families of the victims made complaints towards the government about their neglect to care and maintain for the memorial, and that it was in need of restoration

Artist who have made exhibitions and publications inspired by Huang Rong-can's life and work are Mei Dean E (1997 and 2003). and Hung Song-dam (2013). There have been several exhibitions in the last five years dedicated to Huang, including an exhibition in the National Museum of Taiwanese Literature in 2013

He is thought of as the first artist in Taiwan to belong to the Chinese left-wing print movement. Although there were other members of the movement who had been to Taiwan and created realistic woodcuts depicting the everyday life, like Zhu Ming Gang, Huang's artworks went beyond this style of realism. His work was able to express his deep concern for common people's lives and hardships

Huang's work can be found in the collections of the Australian National Museum, British Museum, Kanagawa Museum of Modern Art, Taiwan Museum of Fine Arts and the American Museum of Colgate University in Hamilton.

See also
Taiwanese art

References

1920 births
1952 deaths
Artists from Chongqing
Taiwanese artists
Executed people from Chongqing
Taiwanese people from Chongqing
February 28 incident
People executed by Taiwan by firearm